Brehmer is a surname of:

 Anton Brehmer (born 1994), Swedish ice hockey player
 Christina Brehmer-Lathan (born 1958), East German Olympic sprinter 
 Heike Brehmer (born 1962), German politician
 Hermann Brehmer (1826–1889), German physician
 K.P. Brehmer, in full, Klaus Peter Brehmer (1938–1997), German painter
 Lin Brehmer (born 1954), American disc jockey and radio personality
 Manuel Brehmer (born 1978), German rower
 Roland Brehmer (born 1943), Polish Olympic long-distance runner

See also 
 Bremer (disambiguation)
 Bremmer (disambiguation)

Surnames of German origin